Shannon Taylor  (born December 25, 1986) is an American field hockey player. At the 2012 Summer Olympics, she competed for the United States women's national field hockey team in the women's event. She was born in Milford, Delaware. Taylor attended Syracuse University, where she played on the school's field hockey team.

She currently serves as an assistant coach at Saint Joseph's, having previously been an assistant at UMass for three seasons.

References

External links
 

1986 births
Living people
American female field hockey players
Olympic field hockey players of the United States
Field hockey players at the 2012 Summer Olympics
Field hockey players at the 2011 Pan American Games
Richmond Spiders field hockey players
Syracuse Orange field hockey players
UMass Minutewomen field hockey coaches
Saint Joseph's Hawks field hockey coaches
Pan American Games gold medalists for the United States
Pan American Games medalists in field hockey
Sportspeople from Virginia
People from Midlothian, Virginia
Medalists at the 2011 Pan American Games